Abdollahabad (also Romanized as ‘Abdollāhābād; also known as ‘Abdolābād and ‘Abdulābād) is a Khorasani Kurds majority village in Garmkhan Rural District, Garmkhan District, Bojnord County, North Khorasan Province, Iran. At the 2006 census, its population was 605, in 144 families.

References 

Populated places in Bojnord County